Negotiation is a process of resolving disputes through discussion, without using force.

Negotiation may also refer to:

 "The Negotiation", an episode of The Office
 "The Negotiation" (Brooklyn Nine-Nine), an episode
 "The Negotiation" (FlashForward), an episode
 The Negotiation (film), a 2018 South Korean film
 Negotiations (Free Agents album), 2002
 Negotiations (The Helio Sequence album), 2012

See also
 The Negotiator (novel), a crime novel by Frederick Forsyth
 The Negotiator (film), a 1988 movie starring Samuel L. Jackson and Kevin Spacey